Des Smith  or Desmond Smith may refer to:
Desmond Smith (general) (1911–1991), Canadian major-general
Des Smith (headteacher), British headteacher
Des Smith (ice hockey) (1914–1981), Canadian ice hockey defenceman

See also
Des Smyth, Irish golfer